Mark Harvey (born 11 June 1965) is a former Australian rules football player and coach. He played over 200 games during fourteen seasons with the Essendon Football Club, winning three premierships, and was senior coach of Fremantle from 2007 to 2011. In August 2013, he took over as interim senior coach of the Brisbane Lions following the resignation of Michael Voss as senior coach. From 2015 until 2020 , Harvey served as an assistant coach at the Essendon Football Club.

Playing career

Essendon
Harvey played for Essendon Football Club for a total of 14  seasons from 1984 until 1997, playing a total of 206 games where he kicked a total of 171 goals.

Harvey was originally known as a skilful forward, playing that role in the 1984 and 1985 premiership sides, including kicking four goals in the 1985 premiership win. However, injuries in his later career (particularly to his ankles) meant he was used more as a defender, which reduced the stress on his body. In his role as a defender he often played as centre half-back against much taller opponents, making up for his lack of height with his aggressive attack on the football.

Harvey finished in the top five of the Essendon best-and-fairest on four occasions, winning the award in 1992. He was named in the All-Australian team in 1985 and 1993; he also played in premiership sides both those years as well as in 1984. He was also the side's leading goalkicker for the 1985 season, an unusual feat for a medium-sized forward in a premiership winning team. In 2002 he was named as the 18th greatest player to play for the club in the "Champions of Essendon" list.

After Harvey announced his retirement from his playing career at the end of the 1997 season, Harvey was given an emotional farewell by his team-mates after a narrow Round 22, 1997 victory over Adelaide Crows at Princes Park.

In 2001 Harvey admitted that he suffered from bulimia for 3 to 4 years of his playing career, after he gained weight following a broken leg.

Coaching career

Essendon Football Club assistant coach (1998-2005)
Harvey retired as player at the end of the 1997 season, after realising injuries had taken their toll on his body and he could no longer contribute to the side in the way he would like. He remained at Essendon as an assistant coach under senior coach Kevin Sheedy. In the years since was often suggested as a possible senior coach. At the end of the 2004 season, Harvey was a front-runner for a number of coaching jobs, but either wasn't offered or chose not to take each of them, and continued to be an assistant at Essendon. However, after the end of the 2005 season, Harvey resigned as Essendon assistant coach.

Fremantle Football Club assistant coach (2006-2007)
Harvey then to took up a job at Fremantle as an assistant coach under senior coach Chris Connolly.  He helped Fremantle have their most successful season to date in the 2006 season, reaching the preliminary final.

Fremantle Football Club senior coach (2007-2011)
Following a poor start to the 2007 season, Chris Connolly resigned as senior coach after Round 15, when Dockers lost to the Kangaroos by four points, with the Dockers sitting at thirteenth position on the ladder with six wins and nine losses.  Harvey was then appointed the caretaker senior coach of Fremantle Football Club for the remainder of the 2007 season. Harvey made his debut as the senior coach for the first time against Adelaide at AAMI Stadium on 21 July 2007. Fremantle performed very well, scoring their highest ever score in South Australia and winning by 25 points. Harvey led Fremantle to win four of the seven remaining games in the 2007 season, but it wasn't enough to make the finals, finishing in eleventh place.

On 17 September 2007, it was announced that Harvey would be re-appointed as the senior coach of Fremantle on a contract for the next three seasons.

The 2008 season did not start well for Harvey with Fremantle only winning twice in the first thirteen rounds, including a demoralising loss to the previously winless Melbourne despite leading by 50 points at half time in round seven. At the end of the 2008 season, Fremantle under Harvey finished fourteenth on the ladder with six wins and sixteen losses.  The following year at the end of the 2009 season Fremantle under Harvey finished fourteenth on the ladder yet again with six wins and sixteen losses.

In the 2010 season, Harvey returned Fremantle to the finals after a three-year absence. Fremantle won its first three matches of a season for the first time ever; which culminated in an upset seven-point victory over the previous season's premiers, . But late in the season, Harvey rested up to half of his regular side ahead of a match against  in Launceston and the result was a 116-point defeat, just one point off their record margin loss of 117 points suffered against  just a season earlier. But against the same opponents a fortnight later, the Dockers won its first finals match under Harvey, and its first since 2006, with a win by 5 goals.

In the 2011 season, Fremantle under Harvey finished eleventh on the ladder with nine wins and thirteen losses, missing out of the finals. Despite being praised for his efforts in attempting to field a fit Fremantle side late in the season when the club was suffering one of the worst injury tolls in the AFL, Harvey was unexpectedly sacked as Fremantle Football Club senior coach on 15 September 2011 at the end of the 2011 season. He was replaced by former  senior coach Ross Lyon who on the same night of Harvey's dismissal had resigned from his post as Saints senior coach.

Brisbane Lions assistant coach (2012-2013)
In November 2011, Harvey signed on as a senior assistant coach to the Brisbane Lions under Michael Voss for the 2012 season and the 2013 season.

Brisbane Lions caretaker senior coach (2013)
On 13 August 2013, Harvey was appointed caretaker senior coach of Brisbane Lions for the remainder of the 2013 season, replacing Michael Voss who had been told his contract would not be renewed. Voss then opted not to coach out his contract which expired at the end of the 2013 season. Harvey led Brisbane Lions to win two of the remaining three games left in the 2013 season, to finish Brisbane Lions in twelve position on the ladder. Harvey was however not retained as the Brisbane Lions senior coach at the end of the 2013 season.  On 3 October 2013, Harvey quit the Brisbane Lions after Justin Leppitsch was appointed as the Brisbane Lions senior coach for the 2014 season. Harvey then returned to Perth.

Essendon Football Club assistant coach (2015-2020)
At the end of the 2020 season, Harvey stepped down from his role as assistant coach of the Essendon Football Club.

Post coaching-career

At the end of the 2020 season, Harvey transitioned out of coaching, but remained at the Essendon Football Club and moved into a role that works across both sides of the football department and administration. Harvey is heavily involved in pro scouting and opposition analysis in the football department, while also working with the commercial department to engage and connect with key coterie and corporate stakeholders.

Statistics

Playing statistics

|-
|- style="background-color: #EAEAEA"
| scope="row" bgcolor="F0E68C" | 1984#
|style="text-align:center;"|
| 38 || 16 || 28 || 23 || 210 || 39 || 249 || 73 ||  || 1.8 || 1.4 || 13.1 || 2.4 || 15.6 || 4.6 ||  || 6
|-
| scope="row" bgcolor="F0E68C" | 1985#
|style="text-align:center;"|
| 38 || 24 || 48 || 34 || 354 || 121 || 475 || 138 ||  || 2.0 || 1.4 || 14.8 || 5.0 || 19.8 || 5.8 ||  || 7
|- style="background-color: #EAEAEA"
! scope="row" style="text-align:center" | 1986
|style="text-align:center;"|
| 38 || 20 || 21 || 24 || 258 || 72 || 330 || 90 ||  || 1.1 || 1.2 || 12.9 || 3.6 || 16.5 || 4.5 ||  || 0
|-
! scope="row" style="text-align:center" | 1987
|style="text-align:center;"|
| 1 || 1 || 0 || 0 || 1 || 0 || 1 || 0 || 0 || 0.0 || 0.0 || 1.0 || 0.0 || 1.0 || 0.0 || 0.0 || 0
|- style="background-color: #EAEAEA"
! scope="row" style="text-align:center" | 1988
|style="text-align:center;"|
| 1 || 15 || 14 || 10 || 243 || 58 || 301 || 82 || 26 || 0.9 || 0.7 || 16.2 || 3.9 || 20.1 || 5.5 || 1.7 || 0
|-
! scope="row" style="text-align:center" | 1989
|style="text-align:center;"|
| 1 || 12 || 11 || 10 || 150 || 57 || 207 || 51 || 16 || 0.9 || 0.8 || 12.5 || 4.8 || 17.3 || 4.3 || 1.3 || 2
|- style="background-color: #EAEAEA"
! scope="row" style="text-align:center" | 1990
|style="text-align:center;"|
| 1 || 13 || 16 || 14 || 163 || 26 || 189 || 59 || 13 || 1.2 || 1.1 || 12.5 || 2.0 || 14.5 || 4.5 || 1.0 || 0
|-
! scope="row" style="text-align:center" | 1991
|style="text-align:center;"|
| 1 || 12 || 17 || 13 || 164 || 41 || 205 || 78 || 13 || 1.4 || 1.1 || 13.7 || 3.4 || 17.1 || 6.5 || 1.1 || 0
|- style="background-color: #EAEAEA"
! scope="row" style="text-align:center" | 1992
|style="text-align:center;"|
| 1 || 22 || 1 || 1 || 344 || 89 || 433 || 98 || 24 || 0.0 || 0.0 || 15.6 || 4.0 || 19.7 || 4.5 || 1.1 || 2
|-
| scope="row" bgcolor="F0E68C" | 1993#
|style="text-align:center;"|
| 1 || 22 || 7 || 4 || 385 || 109 || 494 || 122 || 25 || 0.3 || 0.2 || 17.5 || 5.0 || 22.5 || 5.5 || 1.1 || 5
|- style="background-color: #EAEAEA"
! scope="row" style="text-align:center" | 1994
|style="text-align:center;"|
| 1 || 8 || 1 || 1 || 124 || 46 || 170 || 43 || 10 || 0.1 || 0.1 || 15.5 || 5.8 || 21.3 || 5.4 || 1.3 || 1
|-
! scope="row" style="text-align:center" | 1995
|style="text-align:center;"|
| 1 || 11 || 0 || 1 || 136 || 33 || 169 || 44 || 5 || 0.0 || 0.1 || 12.4 || 3.0 || 15.4 || 4.0 || 0.5 || 0
|- style="background-color: #EAEAEA"
! scope="row" style="text-align:center" | 1996
|style="text-align:center;"|
| 1 || 24 || 5 || 4 || 313 || 99 || 412 || 105 || 39 || 0.2 || 0.2 || 13.0 || 4.1 || 17.2 || 4.4 || 1.6 || 3
|-
! scope="row" style="text-align:center" | 1997
|style="text-align:center;"|
| 1 || 6 || 1 || 2 || 55 || 25 || 80 || 27 || 2 || 0.2 || 0.3 || 9.2 || 4.2 || 13.3 || 4.5 || 0.3 || 0
|- class="sortbottom"
! colspan=3| Career
! 206
! 170
! 141
! 2900
! 815
! 3715
! 1010
! 173
! 0.8
! 0.7
! 14.1
! 4.0
! 18.0
! 4.9
! 1.2
! 26
|}

Coaching statistics

|- style="background-color: #EAEAEA"
! scope="row" style="text-align:center; font-weight:normal" | 2007
|style="text-align:center;"|
| 7 || 4 || 3 || 0 || 57.1% || 11 || 16
|-
! scope="row" style="text-align:center; font-weight:normal" | 2008
|style="text-align:center;"|
| 22 || 6 || 16 || 0 || 27.3% || 14 || 16
|- style="background-color: #EAEAEA"
! scope="row" style="text-align:center; font-weight:normal" | 2009
|style="text-align:center;"|
| 22 || 6 || 16 || 0 || 27.3% || 14 || 16
|-
! scope="row" style="text-align:center; font-weight:normal" | 2010
|style="text-align:center;"|
| 24 || 14 || 10 || 0 || 58.3% || 6 || 16
|- style="background-color: #EAEAEA"
! scope="row" style="text-align:center; font-weight:normal" | 2011
|style="text-align:center;"|
| 22 || 9 || 13 || 0 || 40.9% || 11 || 17
|-
! scope="row" style="text-align:center; font-weight:normal" | 2013
|style="text-align:center;"|
| 3 || 2 || 1 || 0 || 66.7% || 12 || 18
|- style="background-color: #EAEAEA"
|- class="sortbottom"
! colspan=2| Career totals
! 100
! 41
! 59
! 0
! 41.0%
! colspan=2|
|}

Champions of Essendon 
In 2002 an Essendon panel ranked him at 18 in their Champions of Essendon list of the 25 greatest players ever to have played for Essendon.

Personal life 

He was involved in a nightclub fight in Darwin, Northern Territory on 17 June 2007 when he was king hit and knocked unconscious.  This followed Fremantle's loss to Western Bulldogs and on the same night as Chris Tarrant was involved in an altercation with Jason McCartney.

On 13 June 2010 The Age newspaper journalist Emma Quayle revealed in her book Nine Lives: football, cancer and getting on with life on former Essendon Football Club player Adam Ramanauskas that Harvey had, 10 years earlier, suffered from a brain tumour. Following successful treatment, Harvey has remained in remission ever since.

References

External links

1965 births
Living people
Essendon Football Club players
Essendon Football Club Premiership players
Champions of Essendon
Australian rules footballers from Melbourne
All-Australians (1953–1988)
Fremantle Football Club coaches
Crichton Medal winners
Keilor Football Club players
All-Australians (AFL)
Brisbane Lions coaches
Victorian State of Origin players
Three-time VFL/AFL Premiership players